Jefferson Davis County is a county located in the U.S. state of Mississippi. As of the 2020 census, the population was 11,321. Its county seat is Prentiss. The county is named after Mississippi Senator and Confederate President Jefferson Davis. The county was carved out of Covington and Lawrence counties in March 1906. Governor James K. Vardaman signed the bill creating the county on May 9, 1906.

History
The genesis of the county occurred on March 31, 1906, when a Mississippi state legislative act authorized the new country's boundaries. The residents of western Covington County and eastern Lawrence County had frequently complained of the rivers and streams impeding the route to their respective county seats. Jefferson Davis County was the state's 77th county.

A 1906 special referendum determined that the county seat would be Prentiss, named for either famed Mississippi lawmaker and orator Seargent Smith Prentiss, or wealthy landowner Prentiss Webb Berry. The settlement was originally named Blountville after early settler William Blount.

In 1933, the county was the first in Mississippi to issue a prohibition on alcohol after the repeal of the Eighteenth Amendment to the United States Constitution. Round dancing in the community hall was banned in 1938.

In 1935, notorious bank robber Raymond Hamilton, known to hide out in the county's wilderness, was involved in a hostage situation after robbing Prentiss' Bank of Blountville, but escaped in Memphis.

Geography

Major highways
  U.S. Route 84
  Mississippi Highway 13
  Mississippi Highway 35
  Mississippi Highway 42
  Mississippi Highway 43

Adjacent counties
 Simpson County (north)
 Covington County (east)
 Lamar County (southeast)
 Marion County (south)
 Lawrence County (west)

Demographics

2020 census

As of the 2020 United States census, there were 11,321 people, 4,713 households, and 3,003 families residing in the county.

2010 census
As of the 2010 United States Census, there were 12,487 people living in the county. 59.9% were Black or African American, 38.7% White, 0.3% Native American, 0.1% Asian, 0.3% of some other race and 0.7% of two or more races. 0.8% were Hispanic or Latino (of any race).

2000 census
As of the census of 2000, there were 13,962 people, 5,177 households, and 3,768 families living in the county.  The population density was 34 people per square mile (13/km2).  There were 5,891 housing units at an average density of 14 per square mile (6/km2).  The racial makeup of the county was 57.38% Black or African American, 41.66% White, 0.14% Native American, 0.18% Asian, 0.01% Pacific Islander, 0.08% from other races, and 0.57% from two or more races.  0.77% of the population were Hispanic or Latino of any race.

There were 5,177 households, out of which 32.9% had children under the age of 18 living with them, 45.7% were married couples living together, 21.6% had a female householder with no husband present, and 27.2% were non-families. 25.0% of all households were made up of individuals, and 11.9% had someone living alone who was 65 years of age or older.  The average household size was 2.68 and the average family size was 3.20.

In the county, the population was spread out, with 28.4% under the age of 18, 9.9% from 18 to 24, 25.4% from 25 to 44, 22.5% from 45 to 64, and 13.8% who were 65 years of age or older.  The median age was 35 years. For every 100 females there were 89.9 males.  For every 100 females age 18 and over, there were 84.7 males.

The median income for a household in the county was $21,834, and the median income for a family was $27,594. Males had a median income of $23,942 versus $16,510 for females. The per capita income for the county was $11,974.  About 23.2% of families and 28.2% of the population were below the poverty line, including 38.7% of those under age 18 and 24.5% of those age 65 or over.

Communities

Towns
 Bassfield
 Prentiss (county seat)

Unincorporated communities
 Carson
 Oak Vale (partly in Lawrence County)

Ghost town
 Mount Carmel

Politics
Jefferson Davis County is heavily Democratic. It has only voted for the Republican candidate for president three times since 1912 (although long ago it also voted for third-party segregationist candidates three times). Prior to the 1960s, its Democratic lean was due to its location in the "Solid South". At the statewide level, Jefferson Davis County has only voted for the Republican candidate for governor once since Reconstruction: for Kirk Fordice in 1991.

See also
 National Register of Historic Places listings in Jefferson Davis County, Mississippi

References

External links
 Jefferson Davis County Website
 Jefferson Davis County Courthouse Pictures
 Jefferson Davis County Economic Development District Website

 
Mississippi counties
1906 establishments in Mississippi
Populated places established in 1906
Black Belt (U.S. region)
Majority-minority counties in Mississippi